The Klootchy Creek County Park, or Klootchy Creek Park, is a park in the U.S. state of Oregon. It was previously home to the largest tree in the state, a Sitka spruce.

References

Parks in Oregon
Parks in Clatsop County, Oregon